Cole Croston (born December 25, 1993) is an American football offensive tackle who is currently a free agent. He played college football at Iowa.

Early life
Croston was born in Sergeant Bluff, Iowa, son to Kim and Dave Croston. Dave, a former third round draft pick of the Green Bay Packers in 1987, was a starting offensive tackle and three-year letterman for Hayden Fry's Iowa Hawkeyes in the mid-1980s. Cole later attended Sergeant Bluff-Luton High School.

College career
Croston, who grew up an Iowa fan due to his father's connection with the university, was initially a walk-on for the Hawkeyes. He was a two-year starter and received honorable mention All-Big Ten honors his senior season. He was the 2015 winner of the Next Man In Award on the offensive side of the ball.

Professional career
Croston signed with the New England Patriots as an undrafted free agent on May 5, 2017. He made the Patriots 53-man roster as a reserve due to his versatility to play both tackle and guard. He was inactive the first nine games of the season before making his NFL debut in Week 11, coming in at left guard to finish the game in a 33–8 win over the Raiders. The Patriots reached Super Bowl LII and lost 41–33 to the Philadelphia Eagles.

On September 1, 2018, Croston was waived by the Patriots and was signed to the practice squad the next day. He was promoted to the active roster on September 15, 2018. He was waived on November 6, 2018, and was re-signed to the practice squad. Croston was a part of the Patriots Super Bowl LIII winning team when they defeated the Los Angeles Rams 13–3. He signed a reserve/future contract with the Patriots on February 5, 2019.

On July 30, 2019, Croston was waived by the Patriots, but was re-signed on August 12, 2019. He was released during final roster cuts on August 31, 2019.

References

External links
Iowa Hawkeyes bio
New England Patriots bio

1993 births
Living people
People from Woodbury County, Iowa
Players of American football from Iowa
American football offensive tackles
Iowa Hawkeyes football players
New England Patriots players